Khalili is a common Arabic-based surname, meaning "originating from Al-Khalil also known as Hebron". It is composed of root word Khalil (meaning "companion" or "friend") plus the Arabic suffix "i" meaning "from" or "of". Khalili is also commonly used in Persian, Afghani and other Muslim surnames.

Khalili may refer to:

Persons

Khalili 
Abbas Khalili, also known as Abbas al-Khalili (1896–1972), Iraqi-born Iranian diplomat, newspaper publisher
Abdul Khalili (born 1992), full name Abdul Rahman Khalili, Swedish football player of Palestinian origin
Anousheh Khalili (born 1983), Iranian-American singer-songwriter 
Aram Khalili (born 1989), Norwegian football player of Iranian Kurdish origin
Fowzieh Khalili (born 1958), Indian female cricketer
Imad Khalili (born 1987), Swedish football player of Palestinian origin
Karim Khalili, Afghani politician, Vice President of Afghanistan
Khalilullah Khalili (1907–1987), alternative spellings Khalilollah, Khalil Ullah, Afghanistan's foremost 20th century poet as well as a noted historian, university professor, diplomat and royal confidant
Laleh Khalili, Iranian-American academic and professor in Middle Eastern Politics
Massoud Khalili (born 1950), Afghani diplomat, linguist and urbane poet
Mohsen Khalili (born 1981), Iranian football player 
Nader Khalili (1936–2008), Iranian-American architect, writer, and humanitarian
Nasser Khalili, (born 1945), British-Iranian scholar, collector and philanthropist
Yasha Khalili (born 1988), Iranian football player

Al-Khalili, or Al-Khalīlī 
Ahmed bin Hamad al-Khalili (born 1942), Muslim scholar, Grand Mufti of Oman
Jim Al-Khalili (born 1962), Iraqi-born British theoretical physicist, author and broadcaster.
Shams al-Dīn al-Khalīlī (1320–1380) a medieval Syrian astronomer

Locations

Azerbaijan 
For localities in Azerbaijan, see Khalilli (disambiguation)

Egypt 
Khan el-Khalili, bazaar in Cairo

Iran 
Khalili, Fars, a village in Fars Province, Iran
Khalili, Sepidan, a village in Fars Province, Iran
Khalili, Isfahan, a village in Isfahan Province, Iran
Khalili, Markazi, a village in Markazi Province, Iran
Khalili, Razavi Khorasan, a village in Razavi Khorasan Province, Iran

See also
Al-Khalil (disambiguation)
Khalil (disambiguation)
Khalilli (disambiguation)